André Luís Santos is the name of:
 André Luíz Alves Santos (born 1972), Brazilian football forward
 André Luís dos Santos (footballer born 1975), Brazilian defender
 André Bahia, full name André Luiz Bahia dos Santos Viana (born 1983) Brazilian football defender